Utralvoherpia is a genus of solenogasters, shell-less, worm-like,  marine  mollusks.

Species
 Utralvoherpia abyssalis Salvini-Plawen, 1978

References

 Salvini-Plawen L v. (1978). Antarktische und subantarktische Solenogastres (eine Monographie: 1898–1974). Zoologica (Stuttgart) 128: 1–305.

Solenogastres